Limavady Wolfhounds GAC is a Gaelic Athletic Association club based in Limavady, County Londonderry, Northern Ireland. The club is a member of Derry GAA and currently caters for both Gaelic football and camogie.

Underage teams up to U-12s play in North Derry league and championships, from U-14 upwards teams compete in All-Derry competitions. Limavady have won the Derry Intermediate Football Championship once and the Derry Junior Football Championship three times.

Gaelic football
This club caters for both male and female Gaelic Football

Notable footballers
 John Deighan - former Derry Goalkeeper.
 Callum Brown - former Derry midfielder currently playing Australian rules football for the GWS Giants in Sydney

Camogie
The Camogie club was reestablished in 2004 after a long absence in the parish. There are U14, and Senior Camogie teams. The Senior Team play in the intermediate Derry League.

Hurling
After a gap of decades, there have been recent efforts to re-establish hurling in the area. Work is ongoing and Limavady fields a U10 team.

Notable hurlers
Henry Patton - Part of Derry's 1903 Ulster Senior Hurling Championship winning team (played for St. Patrick's)

History
Wolfhounds GAC Limavady was officially established in 1980. However, there had a been a history of Gaelic games in the area before the founding of the current club. In 1903 St Patrick's Limavady hurling club was set up; its star player Henry Patton won an Ulster medal as part of the Derry team that defeated Antrim in the 1903 Ulster Senior Hurling Championship final.

Football was also played in Limavady, in the form of O'Connor's Limavady. They won the 1936 and 1941 Dr. Kerlin Cups beating Park (forerunner to the modern-day Banagher team) and Magilligan in the respective finals. The club also contested the Derry Senior Football Championship final in 1937??. Having won the 1938 North Derry Senior Football Championship, they were defeated by Lavey in the 1938 All-Derry Senior Championship semi-final. They reached the All-Derry final in 1941, but were defeated by Ballinascreen. In the late 1960s the St. Michaels GAC club was formed on the banks of the River Roe, from an amalgamation of players from the Limavady, Magilligan, and Glack areas, but later folded.

Success came relatively soon for the Wolfhounds club, when in 1985 five years after their formation they won the Derry Junior Football Championship, Derry Junior League and Neil Carlin Cup. After moving up to Intermediate grade, the club won the 1989 Derry Intermediate Football Championship. The club were relegated to Junior level again in the 1990s and won the Derry Junior Championship twice more, in 1999 and 2003. Following on from this success the club are currently trying to maintain their position amongst the Intermediate ranks.

The Wolfhounds enjoyed a prosperous 2018: winning the Derry Junior Treble of League, Championship and Neil Carlin Cup; winning a play-off game for promotion into Intermediate football and reaching the final of the Ulster Junior Championship. Dominic Woods and Noel McFeely assumed managerial roles at the beginning of the season, with Neil McCloy appointed in a coaching role. In particular, the season was marked by the introduction of Callum Brown into the senior side. Callum had previously represented Derry minors in an All-Ireland Final defeat to Kerry and his growing reputation across Ireland injected much excitement into the season's build-up. The anticipation was well-founded, with Callum often displaying feats of spectacular athletic ability and, in particular, putting forth a dominant display against a tough Ballerin side in an intermediate play-off game.

Football titles

Senior

 Derry Intermediate Football Championship: 1
1989
 Derry Intermediate Football League: 1
1989
James O'Hagan Cup: 2
2010, 2021
Derry Junior Football Championship: 4
1985, 1999, 2003, 2018
Derry Junior Football League: 3
1985, 2010, 2018
Neil Carlin Cup: 5
1985, 1999, 2004, 2010, 2018

Minor
Minor 'B' Football Championship: 4
1993, 1995, 2020, 2021
Carlin/Duffy Cup: 1
2010

Under 16
All County 'B' league: 2
2007, 2010

Note: The above lists may be incomplete. Please add any other honours you know of.

See also
Derry Intermediate Football Championship
List of Gaelic games clubs in Derry

External links
Wolfhounds GAC website

References

Gaelic games clubs in County Londonderry
Gaelic football clubs in County Londonderry
1980 establishments in Northern Ireland
Limavady